Rod Coleman may refer to:

 Rod Coleman (American football) (born 1976), American football defensive tackle
 Rod Coleman (motorcycle racer) (born 1926), Grand Prix motorcycle road racer from New Zealand